Or Is It? is the fourth studio album by King Creosote, released in 1998.

Track listing
Powerful Stuff 
Rain Weekend 
Empty Town 
Jump at the Cats 
Folk Section #1 
Sans Restraint 
Head 
So Forlorn 
Find Me Town Empty 
Leslie 
Mail Train 
Folk Section #2 
Lighthouse 
The Bear 
Old John (Plus Simple Simon and the Missing Pieman "Gink Scootere")

1998 albums
King Creosote albums